Quai Aimé-Césaire is a quay on the right bank of the Seine in the 1st arrondissement of Paris, France.

Location
The quay is entirely located between the Seine and the Tuileries Garden. The vehicles can drive on the quay from west to east only.

The quay is served by station Tuileries of Métro Line 1, as well as by RATP Bus Lines 24 and 72 and Noctilien Lines 11 and 24.

History

Until the First French Empire, the path on the southern boundary of the Tuileries Garden was a dirt track. It was paved in 1806.

The quay was inaugurated under its current name on 26 June 2013 on a former part of Quai des Tuileries. Its name referring to Martinican poet, author and politician Aimé Césaire was chosen by the Paris Municipal Council in March 2013.

See also
List of streets in the 1st arrondissement of Paris

References

Quais in Paris
Streets in the 1st arrondissement of Paris